The Brangus is an American hybrid breed of beef cattle derived from cross-breeding of American Angus and Brahman stock. Registered animals have 5/8 Angus and 3/8 Brahman parentage. A similar hybrid breed, the Australian Brangus, was separately developed in Australia from about 1950.

History 

Research into crossbreeding of Angus and Brahman stock was begun in about 1932 at the Iberia Livestock Experiment Station of the Agricultural Research Service of the United States Department of Agriculture near Jeanerette, Louisiana, where crossbreeding of Brahman and Shorthorn cattle had already shown good results. It was hoped that the good adaptation of the Brahman to hot and humid conditions could be combined with the better meat qualities of the Angus, as well as its black coat and polled characteristic. An ideal proportion of 5/8 Angus to 3/8 Brahman was established. By 1949 the cattle were distributed in sixteen American states and in Canada. A breed society, the American Brangus Breeders' Association, was formed in that year; it later became the International Brangus Breeders' Association.  

In 2016 the Brangus was present in twenty-six American states.

It has been exported to many countries, particularly in South America. It is reported (without distinction from the Australian Brangus) from twenty countries, with large populations in Brazil, Mexico and South Africa.

References

Cattle breeds originating in the United States
Beef cattle breeds
Cattle breeds